The NWA North American Heavyweight Championship was a professional wrestling championship created by the National Wrestling Alliance in 1994 after World Championship Wrestling withdrew from the NWA. There were various regional versions of the North American title before the creation of this all-NWA recognised North American championship. From 1998 to 2000, the title was the major championship in Music City Wrestling.

Title history
Since 1994, there have been forty six total championship reigns. Greg Valentine was the inaugural champion. The record for most reigns is held by Mike Rapada, who won the title five times. The record for longest reign is held by JT Wolfen, who held the belt for 742 days.

Combined reigns

See also
List of National Wrestling Alliance championships
NWA World Heavyweight Championship
NXT North American Championship
GWF North American Heavyweight Championship

References

External links
NWA North American Heavyweight Title Histories
 NWA North American Heavyweight Championship

National Wrestling Alliance championships
Heavyweight wrestling championships
North American professional wrestling championships